Venizelism was one of the major political movements in Greece from the 1900s until the mid-1970s.

Main ideas 
Named after Eleftherios Venizelos, the key characteristics of Venizelism were:

Greek irredentism: The support of the Megali Idea.
Greek nationalism (liberal nationalism)Liberal democracy: Venizelists represented upcoming urban classes that were against the old conservative establishment, which also had close ties with the palace.Pro-Western: Alliance with the Entente against the Central Powers during WWI, and with the Allies during WWII. Also pro-Western during the Cold War, but later diverged with direct confrontation between Greek nationalist forces in Cyprus against British colonial forces. Republicanism: Despite Venizelos' moderation regarding the monarchy, most of his supporters were in favour of a Republic, on the French standards.Mixed economic policies: from economic liberalism to social democracy policies.Anti-Bolshevism': Venizelos rejected the bolshevik system and was the main introducer of the Idionymon anticommunist law in 1929. In a speech he had delivered in the Greek parliament he had stated that socialism is democratic and Bolshevism authoritarian.

In the contemporary sense the ideology incorporates national liberalism, civic nationalism, economic liberalism, liberal democracy, pro-Europeanism, republicanism, secularism, centrism, radical centrism and generally moves from centre-right to social democracy.

 History 
Liberal Party

Venizelos' liberal party ruled Greece from 1910 until 1916. That year, determined to enter World War I on the entente side, Venizelos rebelled against the king and formed a Provisional Government of National Defence in Thessaloniki. Venizelos regained full control of the country in 1917 and ruled until losing the 1920 elections. The strongest support for Venizelism came in the "New Greece" gained after the Balkan Wars of 1912–1913 consisting of Crete, Thrace, Epirus, the North Aegean islands, and Macedonia. By contrast, people in "Old Greece" tended to be more much royalist. The fact that in 1916 King Constantine I had allowed the Bulgarians to occupy parts of Macedonia and had been willing to contemplate giving up all of recently gained "New Greece" in the north to the Bulgarians to weaken the Venizelist movement cemented the identification of people in northern Greece with Venizelism. Refugees from Turkey also tended to be strongly Venizelist, at least until the 1930s and the signing of the Greco-Turkish friendship agreement by Venizelos (1930).

Voters started to favour a balance between Venizelos and Constantine I. This crisis period for Venizelos occurred when Greece experienced a lagging economy, growing political corruption, profiteering by the few, and eight continuous years of mobilization.

After a crisis period (including two short-lived pro-Venizelist military governments after Nikolaos Plastiras 1922 revolution) the liberals returned to power from 1928 until 1932. Venizelists Sophoklis Venizelos and Georgios Papandreou formed the core of the Greek government in exile during the Axis Occupation of Greece (1941–1944), and held power a number of times in the 1950s.

Centre Union

Georgios Papandreou created the Centre Union party in 1961, as a coalition of old Venizelists and progressive politicians. In 1963 the party was elected and held power until 1965, when its right wing broke ranks in the events known as the Apostasia. The current Union of Centrists claims to be the ideological continuation of the old party Centre Union.

Centrist Democratic Union
After the 1967–1974 Junta, Venizelists formed the Centre Union – New Forces party, which then evolved into the Union of the Democratic Centre. While the Venizelist legacy was still popular, election results were disappointing as the abolition of the monarchy, the dilution of support for Greek nationalism after the seven years of the junta and the 1974 Turkish invasion of Cyprus, and Karamanlis' move towards the political centre had blurred the differences between the liberals and their former conservative opponents, while the socialist PASOK party was gaining support at the left side of the spectrum.

Most members of the Centre Union – New Forces party with their leader Georgios Mavros were absorbed by PASOK.

Legacy
Although the image of Venizelos is still very popular in Greece today, Venizelism is no longer a major force in Greek politics. Venizelos' prestige however and his ideology's connotations of republicanism, and progressive reforms means that most mainstream political forces claim his political heritage. There are few explicitly "Venizelist" movements today in Greece. In the 2004 elections for the European Parliament, the leading Venizelist party was the Union of Centrists, gaining only 0.54% of the Greek popular vote. An attempted revival of the original Liberal Party, under the same name, was founded in the 1980s by Venizelos' grandson, Nikitas Venizelos.

Anti-venizelism
There were also various politicians of different political orientation during the 1910s (monarchists, conservatives, part of the clergy, but also socialists/communists of the newly founded SEKE) who were against Venizelos' policies. Some points of disagreement included the Venizelos' extreme pro-Entente stance during the World War I and the National Schism (which led to the division of the country between a venizelist and a royalist government), his policy about the Megali idea and its results (regarding the relations with Turkey and the Greeks who were still under Ottoman sovereignty) and later the Treaty of Lausanne and the population exchange.

With antivenizelism sided also the religious minorities in Greece (Muslim, Jewish etc.), being in general of conservative political orientation. Another common point of the antivenizelists was a criticism about the country's social and economical transformation/modernization, such as critics for political/economical mismanagement.

See also

Greek nationalism
Liberalism in Greece
Metaxism

References

 Further reading 
 Paschalis M. Kitromilides, Eleftherios Venizelos: The Trials of Statesmanship'', Edinburgh University Press 2008, pp. 285–306.

Greek nationalism
History of modern Greece
Political movements
Political movements in Greece
Eleftherios Venizelos
Liberalism in Greece
Eponymous political ideologies
Political history of Greece
20th century in Greece
Megali Idea